Asa Safu Kuthi (Nepal Bhasa:आशा सफू कुथि) is a free library of Nepal Bhasa (Newar) language materials. It is the largest library of Nepal Bhasa materials; it even includes inscriptions and chronicles. It was established in Nepal Sambat in 1116.

Location
It is situated outside the Raktakali Temple in Kathmandu inside Manka Dhuku premises.

Contents
The library contains many books, inscriptions and chronicles. The books are primarily in Nepal Bhasa, but a few books in Nepali are also available. The first floor contains all of the books. The upper floor contains inscriptions and chronicles. A modern system of reading is also applied. One can either view everything directly or through a computer. The books can be photocopied or printed.

External links
http://triyog.edu.np/event/visit-asa-safu-kuthi-library/

http://karunaguthi.weebly.com/thinking-local/our-heritage-asa-safu-kuthi-the-only-archive
Newar-language organizations